A Man of Sorrow is a lost 1916 American drama film produced and distributed by Fox Film Corporation and starring William Farnum. Oscar Apfel directed and wrote the scenario based on a play, Hoodman Blind, by Wilson Barrett.

The same material was remade by John Ford in a 1923 film called by the title of its source material Hoodman Blind.

Cast

See also
 1937 Fox vault fire

References

External links

 

1916 films
American silent feature films
Lost American films
Films directed by Oscar Apfel
Fox Film films
1916 drama films
American black-and-white films
Silent American drama films
1916 lost films
Lost drama films
1910s American films